Buffums, originally written as Buffums&apos; with an apostrophe, was a chain of upscale department stores, headquartered in Long Beach, California. The Buffums chain began in 1904, when two brothers from Illinois, Charles A. and Edwin E. Buffum, together with other partners, bought the Schilling Bros., the largest dry goods store in Long Beach, and renamed it The Mercantile Co. The store grew to a large downtown department store, and starting in the 1950s, grew slowly over the years to be a small regional chain of 16 speciality department stores across Southern California at the time of its closure in 1990.

Over the years, the stores gained a reputation as the “Grand Dame” of department stores in the area.  The stores’ interiors were known for large chandeliers and other upscale touches. The chain marketed itself as “Buffums Specialty Store,” in an attempt to differentiate itself from other local chains, including The Broadway and Bullock's, and the national stores such as May Co. and Robinson’s. Its most famous advertising line, “I’ve been to Buffums,” was used in newspaper and television advertisements during the 1970s and '80s. It was also known for its “Bag-A-Bargain” promotion that placed actual shopping bags (printed with a discount offer) in local newspapers.

Like other local department stores of the era, Buffums was challenged by old-fashioned business models, changing consumer tastes, and the arrival of Seattle-based retailer Nordstrom. The chain was bought in the 1970s by the Australian-based David Jones Ltd, which looked to sell the struggling chain in the 1980s. By the time of the sale it had become part of Adelaide Steamship, an Australian conglomerate, who never found a buyer. In a last-ditch effort to modernize, Buffums installed new IBM point-of-sale registers in all stores in 1990 (to complement their data center's newly purchased IBM AS/400, IBM's then-new midrange computer), only to enter liquidation following the 1990 Christmas shopping season.

Stores

Flagship

Buffums' Downtown flagship grew as follows:

The predecessor of Buffums, Wm. Schilling & Sons dry goods store opened in 1892 at the corner of 2nd and Pine in Long Beach. By 1902 they were located at the Stafford Block, 127–129 Pine Ave., and described as a "commodious",  "department store", "embracing a complete line of dress goods ladies and gents furnishings, clothing, shoes, hats and caps, blankets, comforts, etc.". That same year the father William retired and the firm became Schilling Bros.

In 1904, a partnership bought the Schilling Bros. business for $65,000; the partners were Charles A. and Edwin E. Buffum arrived from Illinois, and local businessmen S. Townsend, W. L. Porterneld and C. J. Walter. The company started operating as The Mercantile Co. The 127–9 Pine Ave. Schilling Bros. store, several doors south of Broadway, would eventually become the men's shoe store of the future Buffums flagship store. The next year, the Mercantile Co. announced the purchase of a lot on the southwest corner of Pine and Broadway, 74.5 ft. by 150 ft. ( with the intention of building a five-story building on it. However, the building would only be three stories and was completed in 1912.

 1924: added a new six-story building; the “New Buffums’” opened in stages in early May, 1924
 1941: built the "Autoport" parking garage (still standing)
 1960: added a Varsity Shop, Red Cross Shoe Store, and four-story parking garage
The new space housed a full Interior Design and Home Furnishings area as a "Sportsman's Shop".

The store competed downtown with smaller, local Long Beach department stores like Marti and Wise Cos. as well as Sears and Ward's, all of which opened large new stores downtown in 1928-9. In the early 1950s Lakewood Center would provide competition with May Company California and Los Altos Center, with The Broadway for the suburban shopper.

The complex was sold in 1981 and was demolished in 1985 to create office space (as of 2020 a WeWork, and Buffums moved its Long Beach store operation and headquarters to the nearby Long Beach Plaza mall when it opened in 1982.

Branches
When Buffums was liquidated it had 16 locations:

Relaunch
A California investor group filed Buffums' Stores, LLC. with the California Secretary of State in January 2015. According to the buffumstores Facebook site, they re-launched in a small specialty format in October 2015, located in the Belmont Shore area of Long Beach, CA. This reappearance of the Buffums name in retail was short-lived, however, as the former principals of Buffums Stores, Inc. moved their operations to Naples, FL, opening their store there under the name The , and shuttering the Belmont Shore 2nd street Buffums storefront in March 2016.

See also
 Dorothy Buffum Chandler

References

Defunct department stores based in Greater Los Angeles
History of Los Angeles
History of Long Beach, California
Companies based in Long Beach, California
American companies established in 1904
Retail companies established in 1904
Retail companies disestablished in 1991
1904 establishments in California
1991 disestablishments in California
Defunct companies based in Greater Los Angeles